The 1984 Utah Utes football team was an American football team that represented the University of Utah as a member of the Western Athletic Conference (WAC) during the 1983 NCAA Division I-A football season. In their third and final season under head coach Chuck Stobart, the Utes compiled an overall record of 6–5–1 with a mark of 4–3–1 against conference opponents, tying for fourth place in the WAC. Home games were played on campus at Robert Rice Stadium in Salt Lake City.

Schedule

Roster

Olaniyan Akyeem
Stephen Baker
Therman Beard
Raymond Bennett
Bryan Bero
Robert Binkele
Mark Blosch
Montel Bryant
Jim Brusatto
Scott Cate, qb
Tim Mitchell, qb
Ed Conley
Tony Cospy
Walt Dixon
Don Enlow
Tim Fahringer
Clarence Fields
Mark Geiselmayr
Andre Guardi, k
James Hansen
James Hardy
Molonai Hola
Morgan Wilson
Danny Huey, wr
Rich Ipaktchian
Mark Jackson
Eric Jacobson
Bob Jenkins
Eddie Johnson
Gerald Johnson
Michael Jones
Craig Kaminski
Ron Ketchoyian
Mike Kruse
Steven Kubitz
Aric Lewis
Eddie Lewis 
Don Logan

Nalin Maxfield
Filipo Mokofisi, lb
Hank Mondaca
Peter Owens
John Paton
Henning Peterson
Kevin Polston
Isaako Poti
Farrell Price
Tom Pritchett
Kevin Reach
Mark Reckert
Reggie Richardson
Wes Saleaumua
Curtis Sampson
Brian Schmitt
Terry Shaw
Chris Smith
Mike Snyder
Mark Stevens, qb
2 Erroll Tucker
Carlton Walker
George Womack
Don Woodward
David White

Coaching staff
Head coach: Chuck Stobart

Assistants:

Game summaries

BYU

References

Utah
Utah Utes football seasons
Utah Utes football